Kevin Michael Byrne (born 1949) was Mayor of the City of Cairns in Queensland, Australia, from 1992 to 1995, and then from 2000 to 2008.

Early life
He was born in Lae, Papua New Guinea 1949. His family had first arrived in Papua New Guinea in 1906 when his grandfather was  appointed Chief Collector of Customs in Port Moresby. His primary education was on Manus Island, Papua New Guinea and he attended Nudgee College, Brisbane from 1963 until 1967.

Military career
Byrne graduated in 1969 from Officer Cadet School, Portsea, Victoria (OCS Portsea) with an Australian Army commission. He was awarded the Sword of Honour for Leadership in that year. His 17-year military career included Australian and overseas postings to Malaysia, Singapore, Papua New Guinea, Rhodesia and South Vietnam. His final military assignment was as a Senior Instructor at the Royal Military College, Duntroon, 1987.

Working life
Byrne served as the regional manager in the Office of Northern and Regional Development, Cairns, between 1987 and 1990. In 1990 he became the regional manager of the Queensland Confederation of Industry.

Byrne was elected Mayor of Cairns 1992; and re-elected 1994. In 1995, he was defeated by Tom Pyne.

He served as the Administrative Director for an oil spill cleanup operation, funded by the World Bank and European Bank of Reconstruction and Development, in the Kolva Basin, in the Komi Republic, part of the Russian Federation.

In December 1995, Byrne was appointed as the Chief Executive of the Papua New Guinea Tourism Promotion Authority. He was a member of the national negotiating team for bilateral air service agreements; the acting chairman of the National Airline Commission for two years; deputy chairman of Air Niugini for eighteen months; and a national delegate to the APEC Working Groups on Tourism and Trade.

In December 1999, Byrne returned to Cairns; and was re-elected as Mayor of Cairns on 25 March 2000 and again in March 2004. In 2008 he was defeated by Val Schier for the position of mayor of the Cairns Regional Council.

Controversy 
Byrne was the subject of media attention and controversy for involvement with property developers, attitudes towards racial issues, and his approach to government and the electorate. Some examples of the unproven allegations include:

Allegations of racism 
An aborted attempt by the Byrne Council to secretly bus indigenous people from the Cairns region to the remote Lockhart River region.

Contravened electoral policies
Allegations (and subsequent referral to the Crime and Misconduct Commission) by a local ratepayers group that he contravened electoral and ethical policies by maintaining an undeclared involvement in other primary businesses during his mayoralty.

Close ties with developers
A self-acknowledged perception that he was 'in the developers pockets', ultimately attributed by him as the reason for his defeat in 2008. Three months later he accepted employment as a senior director with a Cairns property developer. Tragically, the managing director of the company was later murdered and the company went into receivership.

Ethical misconduct by his wife
An investigation of Lady Mayoress Amanda Byrne for ethical misconduct under the terms of the Property Agents and Motor Dealers Act 2000 (PAMD Act). She was ultimately found guilty of charges by the office of fair trading and, in a move unprecedented in Queensland, she was banned for life from practising as an accommodation manager.

Ignoring disaster risk advice
That advice from government environmental body Geoscience Australia that warned of a serious disaster risk in approving new development on the Cairns slopes and some low-lying areas was set-aside in favour of more favourable reports from the Council's own engineers.

Higher education
Byrne claims formal qualifications from Kensington University. Located in Glendale, California, Kensington was an unaccredited distance education provider that was shut down by state authorities there after the state Council for Private Postsecondary and Vocational Education found that "little or no rigor or credible academic standards are necessary in order to be awarded an advanced degree at Kensington University." The attributed qualification is a Master of Arts (Business Administration and Management) with GPA 4, granted in 1993 by Kensington University.

Awards
In 2000 Byrne was awarded the Papua New Guinea Independence Medal (25th Anniversary) for services to Aviation and Tourism; and the Australian Centenary Medal for services to Local Government, in 2001.

References

Mayors of Cairns
Living people
1949 births
Graduates of the Officer Cadet School, Portsea